Michelle van der Pols (born 6 January 1989) is a Dutch field hockey player, who plays as a midfielder for Dutch club SV Kampong. She also plays for the Netherlands national team and she was part of the Dutch squad that became 2007 Champions Trophy winner.

van der Pols also was a member of the Netherlands' 2010 Women's Hockey World Cup team.

References

1989 births
Living people
Dutch female field hockey players
Sportspeople from Utrecht (city)
SV Kampong players
20th-century Dutch women
21st-century Dutch women